The Kunderang Brook, a perennial stream that is part of the Macleay River catchment, is located in the Northern Tablelands and Mid North Coast regions of New South Wales, Australia.

Course and features
Much of the river flows through remote country within the Oxley Wild Rivers National Park and The Castles Nature Reserve. The river descends  over its  course.

See also

 Rivers of New South Wales
 List of rivers of New South Wales (A-K)
 List of rivers of Australia

References

External links
 
 Northern Rivers Geology Blog - Macleay River

 

Rivers of New South Wales
New England (New South Wales)
Northern Tablelands
Mid North Coast
Walcha Shire